Agathotoma hilaira is a species of sea snail, a marine gastropod mollusk in the family Mangeliidae.

Description
The length of the shell attains 6.5 mm, its diameter 2.5 mm.

(Original description) The small, elevated shell is translucent white, elevated. The protoconch contains two or more smooth whorls (defective in the specimen). The five subsequent whorls are reticulated, moderately rounded, slightly shouldered. The suture is distinct, not appressed. The spiral sculpture consists of (on the penultimate whorl four) stronger threads the posterior forming the shoulder, and between them in the wider interspaces much finer intercalary threads. On the base of the shell the minor threads become close-set and coarser. The axial sculpture consists of (on the body whorl fourteen or more) low threadlike ribs extending to the siphonal canal and shortly sigmoid behind the shoulder. The aperture is narrow. The outer lip is varicose, within smooth, though the spiral sculpture shining through the translucent shell gives the effect of liration. The anal sulcus is wide and shallow. The siphonal canal is hardly difl'erentiated.

Distribution
This species occurs in the Sea of Cortez, Western Mexico

References

External links
  Bouchet P., Kantor Yu.I., Sysoev A. & Puillandre N. (2011) A new operational classification of the Conoidea. Journal of Molluscan Studies 77: 273-308. 
  Tucker, J.K. 2004 Catalog of recent and fossil turrids (Mollusca: Gastropoda). Zootaxa 682:1-1295.

hilaira
Gastropods described in 1919